Dictionnaire biographique du mouvement ouvrier international (DBMOI, "Biographical Dictionary of the International Labor Movement") is a nine-volume labor movement biographical dictionary series edited by historian Jean Maitron and his successor . It extends the Dictionnaire biographique du mouvement ouvrier français to countries outside of France and is part of the collection together known as Le Maitron.

Bibliography

External links 

 

Biographical dictionaries
French-language books
Books about socialism
Le Maitron